Collaborations is a compilation album released by Irish singer Sinéad O'Connor in 2005.  The album contains songs recorded throughout O'Connor's career on which she collaborated with a variety of artists, spanning several different genres of music.  Many of these tracks appeared on the albums of the artists with whom O'Connor performs. The tracks "Empire" and "Heroine" also appear on So Far... The Best of Sinéad O'Connor, released in 1997.  One track - "Monkey in Winter" - had never been never released on CD before, and was previously released as B-side on a 12" only.

Track listing
 "Special Cases" (radio edit) (with Massive Attack) – 3:48
 "1000 Mirrors" (with Asian Dub Foundation) – 4:54
 "Empire" (with Bomb the Bass) – 5:50
 "Guide Me God" (with Ghostland) – 3:31
 "Visions of You" (with Jah Wobble's Invaders of the Heart) – 4:21
 "Release" (album edit) (with Afro Celt Sound System) – 4:14
 "Wake Up and Make Love with Me" (with Blockheads) – 4:58
 "Kingdom of Rain" (album version) (with The The) – 5:51
 "I'm Not Your Baby" (with U2) – 5:50
 "Tears from the Moon" (album version) (with Conjure One) – 4:18
 "Blood of Eden" (radio edit) (with Peter Gabriel) – 5:05
 "Harbour" (with Moby) – 6:25
 "Up in Arms" (with Aslan) – 3:40
 "It's All Good" (with Damien Dempsey) – 4:23
 "Heroine (Theme from Captive)" (with The Edge) – 4:25
 "Monkey in Winter" (with The Colourfield) – 5:01
 "All Kinds of Everything" (with Terry Hall) – 2:44

Personnel 

Asian Dub Foundation – Producer, Engineer
Howie B – Producer, Mixing
Louis Beckett – Organ, Producer, Engineer
Paul Bergen – Photography
Bono – Vocals
Mark Borthwick – Photography
David Bottrill – Producer, Engineer, Mixing
Alan Branch – Producer, Mixing
Michael Brook – Producer
George Chin – Photography
Adam Clayton – Bass
Nick Coplowe – Producer, Engineer
Neil Davidge – Producer
Robert "3D" Del Naja – Vocals, Keyboards, Producer
Pearse Dunne – Engineer
The Edge – Guitar, Keyboards, Vocals
Simon Emmerson – Producer
Brian Eno – Producer
Paul Falcone – Assistant
Flood – Producer
Greg French – Assistant
Rhys Fulber – Producer
Peter Gabriel – Vocals, Producer
Chris Garcia – Engineer
Reece Gilmore – Programming
Richard Gottehrer – Producer
Ian Grimble – Producer, Mixing
Rachel Gutek – Artwork
Terry Hall – Vocals, Producer
Steve Howe – Guitar, Vocals
Don Hozz – Programming
Mick Hutson – Photography
Invaders of The Heart – Producer
Matt Johnson – Vocals, Guitar, Keyboards
Felix Kendall – Producer, Engineer, Mixing
Kieran Kiely – Keyboards
Rob Kirwan – Assistant
Clive Langer – Producer
Daniel Lanois – Producer
Claire Lewis – Assistant Engineer
Steve Lillywhite – Producer, Remixing
Warne Livesey – Producer
James McNally – Producer
Sonia Mehta – Vocals
Marco Migliari – Assistant Engineer
Moby – Vocals, Producer, Mixing
Kevin Moloney – Engineer
Larry Mullen Jr. – Drums
Gil Norton – Producer, Remixing
Rick Nowels – Producer
Adam Nunn – Mastering
Linda Nylind – Photography
Ed O'Brien – Guitar, Vocals
Sinéad O'Connor – Vocals, Guitar
Rob OGeigheannaigh – Tin Whistle
Steve Osborne – Vocal Producer
Q – Engineer
Nigel Reeve – A&R
Brian Reeves – Producer, Mixing
John Reynolds – Drums, Producer, Vocal Engineer
Carmen Rizzo – Programming
Jake Rousham – Engineer
Martin Russell – Producer, Engineer
Al Scott – Engineer
Adrian Sherwood – Producer, Mixing
Tim Simenon – Producer, Mixing
Dave Slevin – Engineer
Mark "Spike" Stent – Producer, Engineer, Mixing
Adrian Thrills – Liner Notes
Randy Wine – Engineer
Alan Winstanley – Producer
Nick Wollage – Engineer

References

External links
 

Sinéad O'Connor albums
2005 compilation albums
Collaborative albums
Capitol Records compilation albums
Albums produced by John Reynolds (musician)